The 1973 Kilkenny Senior Hurling Championship was the 79th staging of the Kilkenny Senior Hurling Championship since its establishment by the Kilkenny County Board.

On 14 October 1973, Fenians were the defending champions.

Fenians won the championship after a 7-08 to 5-10 defeat of James Stephens in the final. It was their third championship title overall and their second title in succession.

Results

Final

References

Kilkenny Senior Hurling Championship
Kilkenny Senior Hurling Championship